Mary Fiennes, Baroness Dacre (1524 – 1578+) was the daughter of George Neville, 5th Baron Bergavenny by his third wife, Lady Mary Stafford, youngest daughter of Edward Stafford, 3rd Duke of Buckingham.

Life

In 1536 she married Thomas Fiennes, 9th Baron Dacre (c. 1515-1541), who was convicted of the murder of a gamekeeper and hanged as a common criminal at Tyburn in 1541.  The family was stripped of its lands and titles by Henry VIII.

In the following years, Mary battled to have the properties restored on behalf of her children, and on her ascension in 1558 Elizabeth restored the title of Baron Dacre to Mary's second son Gregory, her eldest son Thomas having died of the plague at age 15.

By her first husband, Lady Dacre was the mother of:

 Thomas Fiennes (1538–1553)
 Gregory Fiennes, 10th Baron Dacre (1539–1594)
 Margaret Fiennes, 11th Baroness Dacre (1540–1611)

Lady Dacre married twice after her first husband's death and had several other children about whom little is known.

Mary Fiennes second marriage was to John Wooton/Wotton of North Tuddenham, Norfolk, of the Wottons of St. Clere's manor in North Tuddenham, Norfolk, a relative of the Le Strange family of Hunstanton, whom she wed some time before 18 May 1546. After his death, date unknown, she married Francis Thursby of Congham in Norfolk the son of Thomas Thursby (d.1543) of Ashwicken, and the grandson of Thomas Thursby (d.1510), thrice Mayor of King's Lynn, and had six additional children.

According to An account of the families of Lennard and Barrett by Thomas Barrett-Lennard, Lady Dacre had in 1559 three living sons and three daughters by her third husband, Francis Thursby of Congham. The author references an MS. petition by her son Gregory, Lord Dacre to Queen Elizabeth I in 1559.

Samson Lennard, who would marry Lady Dacre’s daughter Margaret Fiennes, later 11th Baroness Dacre, would keep some of Francis Thursby’s old papers, endorsing them in his own handwriting as ‘Notes of olde Mr. Thorisbye’.

Portraits

Lady Dacre is the sitter in two significant portraits by Hans Eworth.

Susan E. James writes of the first of these portraits:This work is powerful in its message, striking in its design and quite possibly the first protest painting to be executed in England. The rich background and clear colors used in the draperies and furniture set off the somber mood and mourning gown of the sitter. Dressed as an icon of virtuous widowhood despite her ongoing marriage to Francis Thursby, Mary sits sober and erect in a chair of estate, posed in front of gathered green draperies and a busy tapestry featuring vines of roses, the flower of virtue and, parenthetically, the emblem of the Tudors.Of the 1559 portrait by Hans Eworth, with her son Gregory, Susan E. James writes:In order to commemorate Gregory's majority in 1559 and in anticipation of the return of his inheritance by the crown, Mary commissioned Has Eworth to paint another portrait. Like Lady Anne Clifford's Great Picture, this work is a memorial to one woman's legal success in the securing of the family estates. The painting Mary Neville commissioned is the unusual double portrait of herself and her son, Gregory, now on loan to the National Portrait Gallery, which has been called 'one of the finest works to be painted in Britain in the mid-sixteenth century'.
Recently, the Wrest Park Portrait, long said to be of Lady Jane Grey, has been identified as Mary Neville Fiennes, Lady Dacre, by Dr. John Stephan Edwards. Dr. John Stephan Edwards dates the Wrest Park Portrait to 1545–1549, the early years of her widowhood after the death of her husband.

He describes it thusly:Together the NPG and Ottawa portraits depict the second and third acts of a life-drama involving the execution of Lady Dacre’s first husband and her severely reduced circumstances as a young widow, her long and determined struggle to regain lost wealth, lands, titles and status, and the ultimate success of her quest. Missing from the visual record, however, is the first act of Mary Fiennes’s story: her relative impoverishment as a new widow with three children to support.The portrait of Mary Neville Fiennes, Lady Dacre and her son Gregory was misidentified as Lady Jane Grey's mother Frances Brandon, Duchess of Suffolk, and her second husband, Adrian Stokes for centuries.

It is Mary Neville Fiennes, Lady Dacre who is the representative of Frances Brandon, Duchess of Suffolk in Parliament. She is among the Tudor-era figures portrayed on the walls of the Prince’s Chamber in the Palace of Westminster, commonly called The Houses of Parliament.

Anne of Cleves and Mary I
Both Lord and Lady Dacre were among the party appointed to meet Anne of Cleves and welcome her to England. In 1558, Mary Neville Fiennes, Lady Dacre, assisted at the funeral of Mary I.

Dedications

In 1578, her brother-in-law, Henry Wotton (not to be confused with Sir Henry Wotton), the brother of her late second husband, published A Courtlie Controversie of Cupids Cantils containing five Tragicall Historyes by three Gentlemen and two Gentlewomen, a translation he had made from the French of a collection of Italian romance stories. He dedicated this work to Lady Dacre.

Ancestry

Notes

References

Honig, Elizabeth: "In Memory: Lady Dacre and Pairing by Hans Eworth" in Renaissance Bodies: The Human Figure in English Culture c. 1540-1660 edited by Lucy Gent and Nigel Llewellyn, Reaktion Books, 1990,

External links
 Mary Neville Baroness Dacre at TudorPlace.com

Dacre
Dacre
16th-century English women
16th-century English nobility
English baronesses
Daughters of barons
Mary
Mary